SECU, Stora Enso Cargo Unit, is a type of intermodal container (shipping container) built to transport bulk cargo like paper on railway and ship.

This is compared to the normal  size and  capacity of an ISO Container.

A SECU is too big and heavy to be transported on road (ISO-Containers are designed to fit roads), and instead they are transported only by railway and ship. A special vehicle or crane is used to load and unload them.  Special railcars are also needed. They can be transported on truck ferries, but they don't fit normal container ships.

The benefit is that their much higher weight reduces the number of containers and therefore reduces handling cost. The drawback is that special solutions are needed.

They are invented and used by Stora Enso (forest and paper company). The ports used are mainly in production countries like Finland (Kotka, Oulu) and Sweden (Gothenburg) and in consumer countries Belgium (Zeebrugge), UK (Tilbury, Immingham) and Germany (Lübeck).

Dimensions 

See also 

 Containerization
 Intermodal container

References

External links 

 http://ec.europa.eu/transport/intermodality/motorways_sea/doc/2006_01_24_conference/vehvilainen_en.pdf MOTORWAYS OF THE SEA
 http://www.storaenso.com/media-centre/press-releases/2004/01/Pages/stora-enso-launches-a-joint-transport-supply-syste.aspx Stora Enso launches a joint Transport Supply System for the Nordic mills 
 http://www.freightfreeways.com/media/Presentations/06%20-%20Stora%20Enso%20Clason.pdf RailNetEurope 2005-12-02 Stora Enso Transport and Distribution

Intermodal containers
Port infrastructure